Andreas Peter Hovgaard (1 November 1853 – 15 March 1910) was a Danish naval officer and Arctic explorer.

Hovgaard became a sub-lieutenant of the Danish Navy in 1874, rising to the rank of lieutenant in 1876, captain in 1888 and Commander in 1901. He retired from active service in 1909.

Career
Andreas Hovgaard was the son of Ole Anton Hovgaard (1821–1891) and Louise Charlotte Munch (1823–1872). Little is known about his early life, except that he joined the Danish Navy and quickly rose in the ranks. In 1878 Hovgaard, as a young lieutenant, became a member of Adolf Erik Nordenskiöld's Vega Expedition in which he was in charge of making meteorological as well as geomagnetic observations. Shortly after returning to Denmark he married Sophie Christiane Nielsen (1856–1934) and published his report Nordenskiölds rejse omkring Asien og Europa about the first Arctic expedition that navigated successfully through the Northeast Passage.

In 1882 Hovgaard led the  Dijmphna Expedition, an Arctic survey expedition to explore the unknown northeastern limits of the Kara Sea on steamship Dijmphna, financed by Danish trader Augustin Gamél (1839–1904) who would also later assist Fridtjof Nansen. The Dijmphna became stuck in the ice off Dikson while trying to rescue the Dutch Polar Expedition's ship Varna, which was surveying the mouth of the Yenisei. During the 1882/83 winter it began a long drift in the Kara Sea that prevented the expedition from accomplishing its goals. The ship was able to return home only with the 1883 summer thaw, the Varna becoming lost.

In 1887 he served in the Danish ironclad Dannebrog, the ship of the King of Denmark, Christian IX. From 1890 to 1893 Hovgaard became the Captain of Mail steamer Thyra, which plied the route to the Faroe Islands and Iceland. Later he would be in command of Cruiser Heimdall and of Coastal Defense Ship Olfert Fischer.

Andreas Hovgaard was the President of the Danish Naval Officers Association (Søofficers-Foreningen) between 1907 and 1909.

Honours
Hovgaard Island in Greenland, Hovgaard Island (Ostrov Khovgarda) in the Nordenskiöld Archipelago of the Kara Sea, Russia, Hovgaard Island in Antarctica, and the Hovgaard Islands in Nunavut, Canada, were named after him.
Danish Service medal in gold (1883)
Order of the Dannebrog;  Knight (1880); Commander 2nd Class (1907)
Dannebrogordenens Hæderstegn (1904)

Works
Nordenskiölds Reise omkring Asien og Europa - Populairt fremstillet efter mine Dagböger, 1915 (Danish)
 Forslag til en dansk arktisk expedition, Gyldendal, Copenhagen 1882
 Dijmphna-Expeditionen 1882–83. Rapporter til Dijmphna’s Rheder, Kopenhagen 1884 (Danish)
 Die Eiszustände im Karischen Meere, Gotha 1884 (German)
 Compasset i Jernskibe, Kopenhagen 1888 (Danish)
 Under Islands Kyst, 1906 (Danish)

See also 
 Arctic exploration
 Cartographic expeditions to Greenland
 Severnaya Zemlya

References

External links

1853 births
1910 deaths
19th-century Danish naval officers
20th-century Danish naval officers
Danish polar explorers
Explorers of the Arctic
Honorary Knights Commander of the Royal Victorian Order